Magdalena Ho is a Polish-Vietnamese woman who was crowned as Miss Earth Poland 2015 .

Biography

Early life and career beginnings

She is a daughter of two Vietnamese immigrants.

2015: Miss Earth and Miss Egzotica

The Miss Earth franchise was given to the Miss Egzotica pageant, headed by Serafina Ogończyk-Mąkowska in 2015. Miss Egzotica is an annual pageant for Polish women who have a multiracial roots. The pageant supports diversity to raise awareness in Poland. The pageant was awarded a European Medal by the BCC, European Economic and Social Committee in Brussels and the Ministry of Foreign Affairs. Magdalena Ho was the winner of the pageant in 2014.

Being the winner of Miss Earth Poland 2015, Magdalena has become Poland's representative at the Miss Earth 2015 and would try to succeed Jamie Herrell as the next Miss Earth.

As a Miss Earth delegate, an advocacy is a must. When she was asked about her advocacy as Miss Earth, she answered via Miss Earth official website, "I do my best to promote the protection of the environment as much as I can. It is important to get to as many people as possible and teach them those small things that matter in the big picture: segregation of garbage, cleanness in their homes and outside it and so on. A major role is also played by social campaigns or environmental action which I readily promote and take part in."

When she was also asked about how she can promote her country, she replied, "Apart from the amazing landscapes, I surely would like to mention traditional Polish cuisine, which includes the legendary pierogi, bigos and pork chop. We also carry wonderful culture, tradition and history, which is worth being known by everyone."

References

Miss Earth 2015 contestants
Living people
Models from Warsaw
Polish people of Vietnamese descent
1990s births